The Ireland women's cricket team played the Scotland women's cricket team in May 2021. The tour consisted of four Women's Twenty20 International (WT20I) matches. The teams last played international cricket during the 2019 ICC Women's World Twenty20 Qualifier in August and September 2019. The matches all took place at Stormont in Belfast, and was the first time since 1997 that women's international cricket was played at the venue.

The series was originally scheduled to start on 23 May 2021. However, the opening fixture was abandoned due to rain and moved back to the reserve day.

Scotland won the first match by eleven runs to take a 1–0 lead in the series. Ireland then won the next two matches, by 61 runs and 41 runs respectively, to go 2–1 up with one match left to play. Ireland won the final match by six wickets to win the series 3–1. Ireland's Leah Paul was named player of the series.

Squads

WT20I series

1st WT20I

2nd WT20I

3rd WT20I

4th WT20I

References

External links
 Series home at ESPN Cricinfo

2021 in women's cricket
2021 in Irish cricket
2021 in Scottish cricket
International cricket competitions in 2021